Surviving Mars is a city building survival video game initially developed by the Bulgarian studio Haemimont Games, and later by Abstraction Games, and published by Paradox Interactive. It was released on Microsoft Windows, macOS, Linux, PlayStation 4 and Xbox One on March 15, 2018. The player serves as an overseer who must build a colony on Mars and ensure the survival of the colonists. A spiritual successor, Surviving the Aftermath, was released in 2021.

Gameplay 
Surviving Mars is a city-building survival game that takes place on Mars and is modeled after real Martian data. The player chooses a sponsoring nation, each conferring slightly different benefits and a unique building and vehicle, and then lands on Mars with robotic drones and rovers. These rovers and drones prepare the colony for humans on the red planet by setting up power and water infrastructure, domes, resource depots, oxygen generators, and landing pads. The player's goal is to create a thriving colony on Mars with occasional rockets from Earth, which have limited cargo or passenger space, forcing the player to balance paying to import resources from Earth and producing resources on the planet. For example, the first human colonists will bring limited food with them on their rocket, so farms are crucial to a thriving colony on Mars.

The player can bring electronics, machine parts, food, concrete, metal, prefab (pre-fabricated) buildings, rovers and drones from Earth, or research technologies to manufacture them on Mars. After successfully creating and managing for basic resources on Mars, players can have the option to progress by building domes suitable for human life and advanced resources production. Players must balance expanding the colony by managing oxygen, food, water, electricity and replacement parts while progressing through unlocking technologies by researches. Through the 5 fields of research (Physics, Engineering, Social, Biotechnology, Robotics), players can unlock technologies that will eventually lead them to different wonders. The game also has storylines called mysteries, which add various events to the colony, including plagues, war, rival corporations, AI revolt, alien contact, and others. Rare metals can be exported back to Earth for funds. Landing sites also have various natural disasters like dust storms, meteor storms, cold waves, and dust devils to increase difficulty.

Development
Haemimont Games, the developer of the Tropico series, initially led the game's development. The team studied the real-world challenges that scientists consider when thinking about colonizing Mars. These challenges were then translated into gameplay elements for the game. The game's aesthetics were inspired by The Jetsons and Futurama. Describing the game as a "hardcore survival city-builder", publisher Paradox Interactive announced the game in May 2017. The game was released for Windows, macOS, PlayStation 4 and Xbox One on March 15, 2018 with mod support.

About a year after release, in June 2019, Haemimont signed on with Frontier Developments for development of a new property for Frontier's publishing label. In March 2021, Paradox revealed that development of Surviving Mars has moved from Haemimont Games to Abstraction Games.

Downloadable content
Surviving Mars has several DLCs, available either separately or as part of the digital season pass available in the game's "First Colony Edition". Space Race, the game's first expansion, was released on November 15, 2018, and introduces rival colonies competing to achieve milestones on Mars. The second, Green Planet, was released on May 16, 2019, and introduces the concept of terraforming Mars into a planet that can sustain human life. Several content packs were also released, including a building pack and the "Marsvision Song Contest" radio station (with the release of Space Race) and "Project Laika", which introduced ranching on Mars as well as pets in the colony (with the release of Green Planet).

In March 2021, Dutch studio Abstraction Games took over the development from Haemimont, and released a free update adding space tourism features; a full paid DLC expansion was announced for later in the year. On August 31, 2021, the paid expansion was announced as Below and Beyond, which includes underground facilities and the ability to build mining bases on asteroids. It was released on September 7.

The city-builder game Cities: Skylines, also published by Paradox, received a free update themed around Surviving Mars.

Reception 

The game received generally favorable reviews according to review aggregator Metacritic, scoring 80% on PC Gamer, and 78/100 on IGN.

Notes
  This person worked on Surviving Mars while it was being developed by Haemimont Games from 2018–2021.
  This person has worked on Surviving Mars since Abstraction Games took over development in 2021.

References

External links
 Official site

2018 video games
City-building games
Linux games
MacOS games
Paradox Interactive games
PlayStation 4 games
Survival video games
Video games set on Mars
Video games developed in Bulgaria
Video games developed in the Netherlands
Video games with Steam Workshop support
Windows games
Xbox Cloud Gaming games
Xbox One games